The 5th arrondissement of Paris (Ve arrondissement) is one of the 20 arrondissements of the capital city of France. In spoken French, this arrondissement is referred to as le cinquième.

The arrondissement, also known as Panthéon, is situated on the Rive Gauche of the River Seine. It is one of the capital's central arrondissements. The arrondissement is notable for being the location of the Quartier Latin, a district dominated by universities, colleges and prestigious high schools since the 12th century when the University of Paris was created. It is also home to the National Museum of Natural History and Jardin des plantes in its eastern part.

The 5th arrondissement is also one of the oldest districts of the city, dating back to ancient times. Traces of the area's past survive in such sites as the Arènes de Lutèce, a Roman amphitheatre, as well as the Thermes de Cluny, a Roman thermae.

Geography
The 5th arrondissement covers some 2.541 km² (0.981 sq. miles, or 628 acres) in central Paris.

Demography
The population of the arrondissement peaked in 1911 when the population density reached almost 50,000 inhabitants per km². In 2009, the population was 61,531, while 48,909 worked in the arrondissement.

Historical population

Immigration

History

The Ve arrondissement is the oldest arrondissement in Paris, and was first built by the Romans.

The construction of the Roman town Lutetia dates back from the 1st century BC, which was built after the conquest of the Gaulish site, situated on the île de la Cité by the Romans.

Saint-Hilaire is a ruined 12th-century church in Paris, active until the French Revolution.

Government and infrastructure
The Ministry of Higher Education and Research has its head office in the arrondissement.

Previously the Bureau d'Enquêtes sur les Événements de Mer (BEAmer) had its head office in the 5th arrondissement.

Economy

 (ソニーコンピュータサイエンス研究所) Paris is in the arrondissement.

Maps

Cityscape

Places of interest
 Arènes de Lutèce
 Bibliothèque Sainte-Geneviève
 Centre de la Mer et des Eaux
 Fontaine Saint-Michel
 Institut du Monde Arabe (Arab World Institute)
 Jardin des Plantes and the Musée National d'Histoire Naturelle
 Maison de la Mutualité
 Montagne Sainte-Geneviève
 Musée de Cluny, hosting the Thermes de Cluny
 Musée de l'Assistance Publique - Hôpitaux de Paris
 Musée Curie
 Musée des Collections Historiques de la Préfecture de Police
 Musée de la Sculpture en Plein Air
 The Panthéon
 Quartier Latin
 Val-de-Grâce military hospital

Religious buildings
 Church of Val de Grâce
 Saint-Ephrem church
 Notre-Dame-du-Liban church
 Saint-Étienne-du-Mont church
 Saint-Jacques-du-Haut-Pas church
 Saint-Jean-l'Evangéliste church
 Saint-Julien-le-Pauvre church
 Saint-Medard, Paris church 
 Saint-Nicolas-du-Chardonnet church
 Saint-Séverin church
 La Grande Mosquée (Great Mosque of Paris), created in 1922 after World War I, as a sign of recognition from the nation to the fallen Muslim tirailleurs who lost their lives at Verdun (and in the take-back of Douaumont fort)

Colleges and universities
As part of the Latin Quarter, the 5th arrondissement is known for its high concentration of educational and research establishments.
 Collège de France
 Collège international de philosophie
 École Polytechnique (historical campus; the school has now been relocated)
PSL University
 École Normale Supérieure
ENSCP - Chimie Paris
 ESPCI Paris
Sorbonne University - Faculté des sciences
 Jussieu Campus
Université Paris Cité
 Faculté de médecine de Paris Centre
Institut de Physique du Globe de Paris
 Sorbonne
 Sorbonne University - Faculté des Lettres
University of Paris I Panthéon-Sorbonne
 University of Paris III Sorbonne Nouvelle
 Rectorate of Paris
 Famous lycées with preparatory classes to the Grandes écoles
 Lycée Louis-le-Grand
 Lycée Henri IV

Main streets and squares

 Rue des Anglais
 Rue de l'Arbalète
 Rue des Arènes
 Square des Arènes de Lutèce
 Rue des Bernardins
 Rue Boutebrie
 Rue Buffon
 Rue du Cardinal-Lemoine
 Rue des Carmes
 Rue Censier
 Rue Claude Bernard
 Rue de la Clef
 Rue Clovis
 Place de la Contrescarpe
 Rue Cujas
 Rue Cuvier
 Rue Dante
 Rue Descartes

 Rue des Écoles
 Rue de l'Estrapade
 Rue des Fossés-Saint-Bernard
 Rue des Fossés-Saint-Jacques
 Avenue des Gobelins
 Rue Gay-Lussac
 Rue Geoffroy Saint-Hilaire
 Rue de la Harpe
 Rue de la Huchette
 Place Jussieu
 Rue Jussieu
 Rue Lacépède
 Rue Lagrange
 Rue Lhomond
 Rue Linné
 Rue Le Goff
 Rue Malebranche
 Rue Monge
 Rue de la Montagne Sainte-Geneviève

 Rue Mouffetard
 Place du Panthéon
 Rue Poliveau
 Rue des Prêtres-Saint-Séverin
 Square René Viviani
 Boulevard Saint-Germain
 Rue Saint-Jacques
 Boulevard Saint-Michel
 Rue Saint-Séverin
 Rue de la Sorbonne
 Rue Soufflot
 Rue Thouin
 Rue Tournefort
 Rue d'Ulm
 Rue Valette
 Rue Xavier Privas

References

External links